Ray Ball may refer to:

Ray Ball (footballer) (born 1949), Australian rules footballer
Ray J. Ball, American academic